Holiday Lake is a census-designated place located in Brooklyn Township in Poweshiek County in the state of Iowa, United States. As of the 2010 census the population was 433.

The community surrounds a lake of the same name.

Demographics

References

Populated places in Poweshiek County, Iowa